Lubieszcze  is a village in the administrative district of Gmina Brańsk, within Bielsk County, Podlaskie Voivodeship, in north-eastern Poland.

The village has an approximate population of 210 people.

References

Lubieszcze